Tamarix hispida, commonly known as Kashgar tamarisk, is a species of tamarisk in the Tamaricaceae family.  It is found in Central Asia.  The foliage has a bluish-green color and the plant flowers in autumn.

References

hispida
Flora of Central Asia